Paulo Mandlate S.S.S. (4 February 1934 – 21 August 2019) was a Mozambican prelate of the Catholic Church who served as the Bishop of Tete from 1976 to 2009.

He was born in Gaza Province on 4 February 1934.

He was ordained a priest of the Congregation of the Blessed Sacrament on 6 January 1968. Pope Paul VI named  Mandlate Bishop of Tete on 31 May 1976, and he was ordained a bishop on 26 September of that year.

He was the first black to head that diocese.

He retired as bishop on 18 April 2009.

He died in Maputo on 21 August 2019 at the age of 85.

References

External links
Catholic Hierarchy: Bishop Paulo Mandlate, S.S.S. 

21st-century Roman Catholic bishops in Mozambique
1934 births
2019 deaths
People from Gaza Province
20th-century Roman Catholic bishops in Mozambique
Roman Catholic bishops of Tete
Mozambican Roman Catholic bishops